

Fellows 

Sir Michael Francis Atiyah
Moses Blackman
Hermann Karl Felix Blaschko
William Cochran
Sir William Richard Joseph Cook
William Alexander Deer
Charles Enrique Dent
Robert William Ditchburn
Philip Herries Gregory
Maurice Neville Hill
Douglas William Holder
Sir Stanley George Hooker
Alfred Alexander Peter Kleczkowski
Stanley Mandelstam
Leslie Eleazer Orgel
Francis Rex Parrington
Howard Latimer Penman
Martin Rivers Pollock
Ralph Alexander Raphael
John Stanley Sawyer
William George Schneider
Robert Allan Smith
Michael Meredith Swann, Baron Swann of Coln St Denys
Nikolaas Tinbergen
Harry Lambert Welsh

Foreign members

Daniel Bovet
Fritz Albert Lipmann
J. Robert Oppenheimer
Vladimir Prelog

Statute 12 fellow 

Maurice Harold Macmillan

External links

 
List of Fellows of the Royal Society
Complete List of Royal Society Fellows 1660–2007 in pdf format

1962
1962 in science
1962 in the United Kingdom